West Marion Precinct, formerly township, is Congressional Township 9 South, Range 2 East of the Third Principal Meridian located in Williamson County, Illinois. It is named for the community of Marion, Illinois.

References

Townships in Williamson County, Illinois
Precincts in Illinois